Mazurski or Mazursky is a Polish language family name derived, as an adjective, from the words "Mazur" or "Mazury" (Mazovia) and meaning "of Mazur" or "from Mazur". Notable people with the surname include:

Paul Mazursky (1930–2014), American film director, screenwriter and actor
Mazursky family, several characters in the film Alpha Dog
Alexis and Hernan Mazurski, members of Uruguay national roller hockey team (2010 squad)

Polish-language surnames
Ethnonymic surnames